Mikhail Uralov was a Russian anarchist, the head of the "Black Guard" combat units of the Moscow Federation of Anarchists and a commander of the Revolutionary Insurgent Army of Ukraine.

Biography
In 1918 he was the head of the Moscow Black Guards (MFA). In 1919 he traveled to Gulyaypole and joined the Revolutionary Insurgent Army of Ukraine (RIAU). He was a delegate to the 2nd Gulyaypole regional congress, which took place from February 12–16, 1919. In October, he was elected the head of the Makhnovist garrison in the city of Berdyansk. In late October-early November 1919, the commander of a detachment of the second group of Vdovichenko, created to liberate the Gulyaypol region from the Deniken people. In November–December, he was a member of the Military Revolutionary Council of the Makhnovist army. From the end of 1919, he was Makhno's adjutant and the commander of the 4th brigade of the 1st Donetsk Corps.

In January 1920, Uralov issued an appeal in which he condemned Makhno for speaking out against the Communist Party, Mikhail was soon arrested by the Cheka of Berdyansk, and was later released in March. In May 1920, Uralov was in charge of the political work at the RIAU.

References

Bibliography

 

20th-century Russian people
Russian anarchists
Year of birth missing
Year of death missing